Herman Wilber Snow (July 3, 1836 – August 25, 1914) was an American politician who served as a U.S. Representative from Illinois, the sergeant at arms of the United States House of Representatives, and a member of the Illinois House of Representatives.

Biography
Born in Michigan City, Indiana, Snow moved with his parents to Madisonville, Kentucky, where he attended the public schools. He moved to Sheldon, Illinois and taught school several years before he commenced the study of law. He was admitted to the bar and practiced.

During the Civil War, Snow enlisted as a private in the One Hundred and Thirty-ninth Regiment, Illinois Volunteer Infantry, where he rose to the rank of captain. He re-enlisted in the One Hundred and Fifty-first Regiment, Illinois Volunteer Infantry, and was promoted to the rank of lieutenant colonel. He was provost marshal general of Georgia on Major General James B. Steedman's staff. At the expiration of his service, he taught in the Chicago High School for three years. He returned to Sheldon and engaged in banking, and also served as member of the Illinois House of Representatives from 1872 to 1874.

Snow was elected as a Democrat to the Fifty-second Congress (March 4, 1891 – March 3, 1893). He was an unsuccessful candidate for reelection in 1892 to the Fifty-third Congress. He later served as sergeant at arms of the House of Representatives during the Fifty-third Congress. He moved to Kankakee, Illinois, and resumed banking. He died in Kankakee, and is interred in Mound Grove Cemetery.

References
 Retrieved on 2009-5-12

1836 births
1914 deaths
Sergeants at Arms of the United States House of Representatives
Members of the Illinois House of Representatives
People of Illinois in the American Civil War
People from Michigan City, Indiana
Indiana Democrats
Union Army officers
Democratic Party members of the United States House of Representatives from Illinois
19th-century American politicians